Richard Marshall may refer to:

 Richard Marshal, 3rd Earl of Pembroke (1191–1234)
 Richard Marshall (priest) (1517–?), English Dean of Christ Church and administrator at Oxford University
 Richard Marshall (United States Army officer) (1895–1973), U.S. Army general who served in both World War I and World War II
 Richard Marshall (rugby league) (born 1975), rugby league footballer
 Richard Marshall (defensive back) (born 1984), American football player for the San Diego Chargers
 Richard Bud Marshall (1941–2009), American football defensive lineman
 Richard Marshall (DJ), British DJ who has also recorded under the name Scanty Sandwich
 Richard Purvis Marshall (1818–1872), British pastoral squatter and Native Police officer in the colonies of New South Wales and Queensland
 Richard O. Marshall, creator of high fructose corn syrup with his partner Earl R. Kooi